Euthystira is a genus of grasshopper belonging to the family Acrididae.

Species
List of Orthoptera Species File:

Euthystira brachyptera (Ocskay, 1826) - Small Gold Grasshopper 
Euthystira luteifemora Zhang, F., Yiping Zheng & Bingzhong Ren, 1995
 Euthystira pavlovskii Bey-Bienko, 1954
Euthystira xinyuanensis Liu, Jupeng, 1981 
Euthystira yuzhongensis Zheng, Z., 1984

References 

Acrididae genera
Taxa named by Franz Xaver Fieber
Gomphocerinae